Lincoln's Dreams is a 1987 novel by American author Connie Willis about a historical researcher studying the U.S. Civil War who meets a young woman who seems to be dreaming General Lee's dreams.  Willis brings to her writing a sense of realism and apparently detailed research into historical aspects of her fiction. This book is about parapsychology, metaphysical speculations, death, and love.

Awards
Lincoln's Dreams won the John W. Campbell Memorial Award for Best Science Fiction Novel in 1988, and was nominated for the Locus Award for Best Fantasy Novel that same year.

References

External links
 Review by Science Fiction Weekly
 Lincoln's Dreams at Worlds Without End

Novels by Connie Willis
1987 science fiction novels
Novels set during the American Civil War
John W. Campbell Award for Best Science Fiction Novel-winning works
1987 American novels